R. Howard Bloch is an American literary critic currently the Sterling Professor of French at Yale University, and also a published author. Bloch was elected to the American Philosophical Society in 2010.

On April 29, 2018, Howard Bloch was married to Ellen Handler Spitz in a private religious ceremony that took place in their home in Hamden, Connecticut, the former dwelling place of American novelist and playwright Thornton Wilder, who built the house with the proceeds from his novel The Bridge of San Luis Rey.

References

Year of birth missing (living people)
Living people
Yale University faculty
Yale Sterling Professors
21st-century American historians
21st-century American male writers
Members of the American Philosophical Society
American male non-fiction writers